Jervois Street (formerly ) is a street in the Sheung Wan district of Hong Kong Island, Hong Kong.

History
On 28 December 1851, a fire broke out and burned down Sheung Wan Market and hundreds of Chinese houses all around it, resulting in 30 deaths. The fire led to the redevelopment of the whole district, which was supervised by Major-General William Jervois, then Commander and Lieutenant Governor of Hong Kong.

Nearby 
 Queen's Road Central
 Morrison Street
 Hillier Street
 Cleverly Street
 Mercer Street
 Bonham Strand
 COSCO Tower
 Wellington Street

See also
 List of streets and roads in Hong Kong

References

External links
 

Roads on Hong Kong Island
Sheung Wan